Hillcrest Country Club, also known as Avalon Country Club, is a historic country club located in suburban Lawrence Township, Marion County, Indiana, northeast of Indianapolis, Indiana.  The 18 hole golf course was designed by Bill Diddel and was built in 1924. The clubhouse was built in 1929–1930, and renovated in 2000.  It is a three-story, Mission Revival style with tall arched openings, and a low tile roof with bracketed eaves.  Also on the property are the contributing swimming pool (1934), well house (c. 1940), and water pump (c. 1935).

It was added to the National Register of Historic Places in 2004.

References

Golf clubs and courses in Indiana
Clubhouses on the National Register of Historic Places in Indiana
Mission Revival architecture in Indiana
Buildings and structures completed in 1930
Buildings and structures in Indianapolis
National Register of Historic Places in Indianapolis